The 1958–59 Soviet Championship League season was the 13th season of the Soviet Championship League, the top level of ice hockey in the Soviet Union. Twelve teams participated in the league, and CSK MO Moscow won the championship.

Standings

External links
Season on hockeystars.ru

Soviet
Soviet League seasons
1958–59 in Soviet ice hockey